is a Japanese actress and singer.

Filmography

Film
 Rex: Kyōryū Monogatari (1993)
 Hero Interview (1994)
 Homeless Child (1994)
 Lupin III: Farewell to Nostradamus (1995)
 Kikansha Sensei (1997)
 Star Kid (1997)
 Ohaka ga Nai! (1998)
 Wakkanai Hatsu Manabiza (1999)
 The Boy Who Saw the Wind (2000)
 Tracing Jake (2004)
 Loft (2005)
 Go! Anpanman: Dolly of the Star of Life (2006), Dolly (voice)
 Mameshiba (2009)
 A Courtsean With Flowered Skin (2013)
 Seven Weeks (2014), Ayano Yamanaka
 Zenigata (2018)
 Usuke Boys (2018)
 #HandballStrive (2020), Ichikawa
 Suicide Forest Village (2021)
 The Way of the Househusband (2022), Shiraishi-sensei
Downfall (2023), Karin Makiura

Television
 Gakkō ga Abunai (1992)
 Hitotsu Yane no Shita (1993)
 Homeless Child (1994)
 Seiryū Densetsu (1996)
 Nurse no Oshigoto (1996)
 Glass Mask (1997)
 Cinderella Doesn't Sleep (2000)
 Good Combination (2001)
 Ōoku (2003), Princess Kazu
 Dollhouse (2003)
 Yoi Ko no Mikata (2004)
 Tsumiki Kuzushi: Shinsō (2005)
 Shōfu to Shukujo (2010)
 Mother Game – Kanojo tachi no Kaikyuu (2015)
 Hajimete Koi wo Shita Hi ni Yomu Hanashi (2019), Miwa Matsuoka
 Suteteyo, Adachi-san (2020), herself
 Come Come Everybody (2022), Sumire Misaki
 A Day-Off of Ryunosuke Kamiki (2022), herself

Japanese dub
 Snow White: The Fairest of Them All (2002 re-release) (voice-over for Kristin Kreuk)
 Zombieland: Double Tap (2019) (voice-over for Zoey Deutch)

Discography

Albums
 Love Peace (1994)
 Big (1995)
 Viva! America (1996)
 I Have a Dream (1997)
 Golden Best - Yumi Adachi - (2010)

Singles
 "Genki Dashite Boys & Girls" (1993)
 "Kaze no Naka no Dance" (1995)
 "Nigetai Toki wa" (1995)
 "Bokutte Manmaru" (1997)
 "Namida-kun Sayonara" (1999)

References

External links
 Official website
 
 

1981 births
People from Taitō
Living people
Horikoshi High School alumni
Japanese child actresses
Japanese film actresses
Japanese television actresses
Japanese idols
Japanese television personalities
Japanese voice actresses
Japanese women pop singers
Actresses from Tokyo
Singers from Tokyo
20th-century Japanese actresses
20th-century Japanese women singers
20th-century Japanese singers
21st-century Japanese actresses
21st-century Japanese women singers
21st-century Japanese singers